Mark Sandrich (born Mark Rex Goldstein; October 26, 1900 – March 4, 1945) was an American film director, writer, and producer.

Early life 
Sandrich was born in New York City on October 26, 1900 into a Jewish family. His sister was Ruth Harriet Louise.

He was an engineering student at Columbia University when he accidentally fell into the film business. While visiting a friend on a film set, he saw that the director had a problem setting up a shot; Sandrich offered his advice, and it worked. He entered the movie business in the prop department.

Career

Shorts director 
Sandrich became a director in 1927, making comedy shorts. His first feature was Runaway Girls, in 1928. In an exciting time in the film business with the arrival of sound, he briefly returned to shorts. In 1933, he directed the Academy Award-winning short So This Is Harris!.

Feature films 
Sandrich returned to directing features with Melody Cruise (1933). He followed it with Cupid in the Rough (1933) and two starring the team of Wheeler & Woolsey, Hips, Hips, Hooray! (1933) and Cockeyed Cavaliers (1934).

Astaire and Rogers 
Sandrich did some uncredited second unit work with Flying Down to Rio (1933), a musical featuring Fred Astaire and Ginger Rogers. In 1934, Sandrich was given the job of directing the first proper Astaire–Rogers musical, The Gay Divorcee, which proved a tremendous success.

The following year, he directed Top Hat (1935), another Fred Astaire and Ginger Rogers musical. He continued working with the team on Follow the Fleet (1936).

After directing Katharine Hepburn in A Woman Rebels (1936) he returned to Astaire and Rogers for Shall We Dance (1937), and Carefree (1938).

Paramount 
In 1939, Sandrich left RKO for Paramount, which offered him a chance to be not only a director, but a producer as well.

Sandrich's first film for Paramount was just as director: the Jack Benny vehicle Man About Town (1939). He then turned producer as well as director and made two more with Benny, Buck Benny Rides Again (1940) and Love Thy Neighbor (1940). He also did the romantic comedy Skylark (1941), starring Claudette Colbert and Ray Milland.

While all of these films made profits for the studio, Holiday Inn (1942), starring Fred Astaire and Bing Crosby, with music by Irving Berlin, is most remembered today. Holiday Inn introduced the song "White Christmas" performed by Crosby. "White Christmas" remains the best-selling single of all time.

Sandrich also produced and directed a dramatic war film, So Proudly We Hail! , a 1943 box-office success that starred Claudette Colbert, Paulette Goddard, and Veronica Lake. It was extremely popular and featured a pair of performers – Adrian Booth (billed as "Lorna Gray" in this picture) and George Reeves – whom Sandrich had intended to bring to stardom after the war. Sandrich's last completed films also were war-related -- I Love a Soldier (1944) and Here Come the Waves (1944), both with Sonny Tufts.

Personal life and death
His sons, Mark Sandrich Jr. and Jay Sandrich, went on to careers as directors in film and television.

Mark Sandrich supported Thomas Dewey in the 1944 United States presidential election.

In 1945, he was in pre-production on a follow-up to Holiday Inn called Blue Skies, starring Bing Crosby and featuring Irving Berlin's music. At the same time, Sandrich was serving as president of the Directors Guild.

Insisting that he could complete all of his assignments, and feeling pressure to be an involved and loving family man, Sandrich died suddenly of a heart attack at the age of 44. At the time of his death, Sandrich was considered to be one of the most trusted and influential directors in Hollywood. His interment was at Home of Peace Cemetery.

Select credits

Shorts 
Jerry the Giant (1926) – director
Napoleon, Jr. (1926) – director
Big Business (1926) – director
First Prize (1927) – director
Hot Soup (1927) – director
Hold That Bear (1927) – director
Careless Hubby (1927) – director
A Midsummer Night's Steam (1927) – director
Night Owls (1927) – director
The Movie Hound (1927) – director
Brave Cowards (1927) – director
Monty of the Mounted (1927) – director
Hold Fast (1927) – director
Shooting Wild (1927) – director
Some Scout (1927) – director
Hello Sailor (1927) – director
High Strung (1928) – director
Sword Points (1928) – director
A Lady Lion (1928) – director
A Cow's Husband (1928) – director
Runaway Girls (1928) – director
Two Gun Ginsberg (1929) – director
Gunboat Ginsberg (1930) – writer, director
General Ginsberg (1930) – writer, director
Hot Bridge (1930) – director
Barnum Was Wrong (1930) – writer, director
Off to Peoria (1930) – writer, director
Who's Got the Body? (1930) – writer, director
A Peep on the Deep (1930) – director
Society Goes Spaghetti (1930) – writer, director
Razored in Old Kentucky (1930) – director
Moonlight and Monkey Business (1930) – writer, director
Aunt's in the Pants (1930) – writer, director
Trader Ginsberg (1930) – writer, director
Talking Turkey (1931) – writer, director
The Wife o' Riley (1931) – writer, director
The County Seat (1931) – writer, director
Trouble from Abroad (1931) – writer, director
The Way of All Fish (1931) – writer, director
Cowslips (1931) – writer, director
False Roomers (1931) – writer, director
Strife of the Party (1931) – writer, director
Scratch-As-Catch-Can (1931) – writer, director
A Melon-Drama (1931) – writer, director
Sightseeing in New York (1931) – writer, director
Many a Sip (1931) – writer, director
A Slip at the Switch (1932) – director
Ex-Rooster (1932) – writer, director
The Millionaire Cat (1932) – director
The Iceman's Ball (1932) – writer, director
Jitters the Butler (1932) – writer, director
Thru Thin and Thicket, or Who's Zoo in Africa (1933) – director
Private Wives (1933) – writer, director
Hokus Focus (1933) – writer, director
The Druggist's Dilemma (1933) – writer, director
The Gay Nighties (1933) – writer, director
So This Is Harris! (1933) – writer, director

Feature films 
 Runaway Girls (1928) – director
 The Talk of Hollywood (1929) – writer, director
 Hold 'Em Jail (1932) – writer
 Scratch-As-Catch-Can (1932) – director
 Melody Cruise (1933) – writer, director
 So This Is Harris (1933) – director
 Aggie Appleby, Maker of Men (1933) – director
 Hips, Hips, Hooray! (1934) – director
 The Gay Divorcee (1934) – director
 Top Hat (1935) – director
 Follow the Fleet (1936) – director
 A Woman Rebels (1936) – director
 Shall We Dance (1937) – director
 Carefree (1938) – director
 Man About Town (1939) – director
 Buck Benny Rides Again (1940) – director, producer
 Love Thy Neighbor (1940) – director, producer
 Skylark (1941) – director, producer
 Holiday Inn (1942) – director, producer
 So Proudly We Hail! (1943) – director, producer
 I Love a Soldier (1944) – director, producer
 Here Come the Waves (1944) – director, producer

References

External links 

Obituary at Variety

1900 births
1945 deaths
American film producers
20th-century American Jews
Burials at Home of Peace Cemetery
Columbia University alumni
Presidents of the Directors Guild of America
20th-century American businesspeople
Film directors from New York City